Angkor Golf Resort is an 18-hole golf course located in Siem Reap province, Cambodia. Siem Reap, a resort town in northwestern Cambodia, is the gateway to the ruins of Angkor, the seat of the Khmer kingdom from the 9th–15th centuries.

History 
Angkor Golf Resort opened in December 2008 and was designed by British Golfer and former world number 1, Sir Nick Faldo. Built on former rice paddies, Faldo created subtle undulations, water hazard and aggressive bunkering to create challenge but fair test for all levels of golfer.

The Clubhouse 
The compact yet contemporary clubhouse offers indoor and outdoor dining, men's and ladies changing facilities and a pro shop.

Amenities 
The club has a 300-yard driving range, short game area, golf academy and par 3 practice hole.

The Course 
Angkor Golf Resort Yardage and Slope rating as of 2016

Tournaments at Angkor Golf Resort 
Angkor Golf Resort hosted the 2012 Handa Faldo Cambodian Classic, a professional tournament on the Asian Tour and is the host venue in Asia for the Ladies European Tour LallaAicha Qualifying School. Other annual tournaments include the Faldo Series Asia Cambodian Qualifier, Angkor Amateur Open and Angkor Fourball championship.

References

External links 

Faldo Design Website

Golf clubs and courses in Cambodia
Sport in Cambodia